Whitecap is the sea foam crest over the waves.

As of popular culture, Whitecaps may refer to:

Art, entertainment, and media
 "Whitecaps" (The Sopranos), episode 52 of the television series The Sopranos
"Whitecaps" (Complaint), the ninth song on George Watsky's fifth album Complaint

Political and armed movements
 Indiana White Caps, a late 19th century American vigilante organization
 Las Gorras Blancas, a 19th-century American Southwest group who fought against squatters
 Whitecapping, a violent vigilante movement in late 19th to early 20th century America, mostly in the South

Sport
 Minnesota Whitecaps, an American women's ice hockey team
 Vancouver Whitecaps (disambiguation), the name of current and former Canadian soccer clubs from Vancouver
 West Michigan Whitecaps, an American minor league baseball team
 Brewster Whitecaps, an American summer collegiate amateur baseball team - Cape Cod League 
 Tampa Bay Whitecaps, a proposed name for the American major league baseball team that would become the Tampa Bay Rays\

See also
Whitecap Dakota First Nation, First Nation in Saskatchewan, Canada